Bulbinella nutans is a species of plants in the family Asphodelaceae. It is found in the Cape Province of South Africa.

B.nutans is a large plant, reaching nearly a meter in height. It closely resembles Bulbine latifolia, but has a wider and shorter inflorescence.

B.nutans naturally occurs in the southern Cape, from Cape Town eastwards to the Robertson Karoo, Caledon, and east of Swellendam.

References

Asphodeloideae
Flora of South Africa
nutans